Tourism in Marathwada refers to tourism in the Marathwada region of Maharashtra state in India. Aurangabad is a regional headquarters in Marathwada, and the tourism capital of Maharashtra state. 
Out of the four UNESCO World Heritage Sites in Maharashtra, two are in the Marathwada region. There are also 110 monuments in Marathwada which are protected by Government of Maharashtra and recognized by Archaeological Survey of India.

Marathwada is also important region for religious tourism; 3 of the 12 Hindu Jyotirlinga temples mentioned in the Shiva Purana are in Marathwada. Hazur Sahib Nanded is the second holiest place in Sikhism after the Harminder Sahib (Golden Temple) in Amritsar. There are also Sufi shrines in Marathwada, the most famous among them being Turabul Haq Dargah at Parbhani, where thousands of people of all religions visit the dargah annually. Pathri in Parbhani district is the birthplace of Sai Baba of Shirdi, and the Sai Baba Birth Temple is one of the major religious tourism places in Marathwada.

Caves
The Marathwada region is home to a number of man-made cave temples, monuments, and historic sites.
They were carved in the first century and is the first cave in Asia.
These three caves date back to Satvahan yug, and many artworks were added to Rohilagad samrajya. The sculptures of Rohilagad are considered masterpieces of Hindu religious art.
Ajanta Caves – a UNESCO World Heritage Sites that dates back to the 2nd and 1st centuries BC. During the Gupta period (5th and 6th centuries AD), many more richly decorated caves were added to the original group. The paintings and sculptures of Ajanta are considered masterpieces of Buddhist religious art.
Ellora Caves – a UNESCO World Heritage Sites that dates back to 600–1000 AD. Its sanctuaries are devoted to Buddhism, Hinduism, and Jainism. According to UNESCO, "it illustrates the spirit of tolerance that was characteristic of ancient India".
Aurangabad Caves – twelve 3rd-century Buddhist caves on the campus of Dr. Babasaheb Ambedkar Marathwada University, Aurangabad.
Ghatotkacha Cave (Aurangabad)
Rudreshwar Caves (Aurangabad district)
Kharosa Caves (Latur district)
 Shivleni Caves (Ambajogai, Beed district)
Bhokardan Caves (Bhokardan, Jalna district)
Pandava Caves (Nanded district)
Brahmani Caves (Nanded district)
The caves were noted by Archaeological Department of India and mentioned in the book Archaeological Survey of India by James Burges. Dharashiv Caves have been declared a protected area by Government of Maharashtra.

Religious tourism

Hindu temples
Jyotirlingas are known as "Signs of God Shiva". These are mentioned in the Shiva Purana. It is believed that Shiva first manifested himself as a Jyotirlinga on the night of the Aridra Nakshatra, thus the special reverence for the Jyotirlinga. There is nothing to distinguish the appearance, but it is believed that a person can see these lingas as columns of fire piercing through the earth after he reaches a higher level of spiritual attainment. Though contested with other claimants elsewhere for each of these, the following are Jyotirlingas in Marathwada:
Grishneshwar Temple (Aurangabad district)
Aundha Nagnath Temple (Hingoli district)
Shri Vaijnath Temple (Parli, Beed district)

Two other Jyothirlingas—Bhimashankar and Trimbakeshwar Shiva Temple—are also in Maharashtra state, close to Marathwada.

Other major Hindu temples include:
Tulja Bhavani Temple (Tuljapur, Osmanabad district) – considered one of 51 Shakti Peethas and one among the Saadeteen (3.5) Shakti Peethas of Maharashtra. (A Shakti Peetha is a place to worship various forms of goddess Shakti.)
Renuka Devi temple (Mahur, Nanded district) – another Shakti Pitha among the Saadeteen (3.5) Shakti Peethas of Maharashtra
Ambajogai/Yogeshwari Temple (Ambajogai)
Kailasa Temple, Ellora (Aurangabad district) – one of the largest rock-cut ancient Hindu temples; built in the 8th century by the Rashtrakuta king Krishna I
 Ganesha temple, Rajur Ganapati (Jalna district) – a complete Ganesha Peetha situated on hill in Rajur

 Sai Baba Birth Temple (Pathri) – the birthplace of the Indian spiritual master Sai Baba of Shirdi

Sikh gurdwaras

Marathwada is the second most-visited region by Sikhs in India after Punjab. The main gurdwara in Marathwada is Hazur Sahib in Nanded.

The city of Nanded has been associated with the first and the last of the Sikh Gurus. Guru Nanak Dev passed through Nanded during his extensive travels (which took him as far south as Sri Lanka); Guru Gobind Singh spent his last years in the city. Bhai Daya Singh, one of the Panj Pyare of Sikhism, lived in Aurangabad and has a gurdwara in the city named in his honor: Gurdwara Bhai Daya Singh.

The major gurdwaras in Marathwada include:
Hazur Sahib – the most sacred takht among Panj Takht of Sikhism. It is known for Guru Gaddi, an annual event in November which marks establishment of the Guru Granth Sahib as permanent guru by Guru Gobind Singh. In 2008, on the 300th anniversary of establishment of Guru Granth Sahib, thousands of followers visited the gurdwara.
Gurdwara Bhai Daya Singh – gurdwara in Aurangabad related to Daya Singh
Gurdwara Nagina Ghat Sahib – gurdwara on the riverbank in Nanded
Gurdwara Baba Banda Bahadur Ghat – where Banda Singh Bahadur lived in Nanded
Gurdwara Hira Ghat Sahib – where Guru Gobind Singh first pitched his tent in Nanded on the banks of Godavari River
Gurdwara Mata Sahib
Gurdwara Shikar Ghat Sahib
Gurdwara Mal Tekari Sahib
Gurdwara Sangat Sahib

Islamic sites
Historically, Marathwada was part of Mughal empire and Nizam of Hyderabad, which has given the region its own Islamic heritage in the form of art and culture. The following are some of important places connected with Sufism and Islamic leaders in Marathwada:

Monuments and forts

Of the 244 state-protected monuments in Maharashtra state, 110 are in Marathwada. The following are some of these monuments:

See also

 Tourism in India
 Tourism in Maharashtra

References

Marathwada
Tourism in Maharashtra
Tourist attractions in Aurangabad district, Maharashtra
Tourist attractions in Nanded district
Tourist attractions in Parbhani district
Tourist attractions in Hingoli district
Tourist attractions in Jalna district
Tourist attractions in Osmanabad district
Tourist attractions in Beed district
Tourist attractions in Latur district